Silver Lake is a  lake in Pembroke, Kingston, and Plympton, Massachusetts, south of Route 27 and east of Route 36. The Pembroke/Plympton town line is entirely within the lake, and a portion of the western shoreline of the lake is the town line with Halifax. It used to be called the Jones River Pond, but its name was changed to Silver Lake in the 1800s in a marketing effort to sell more ice from it. The lake is the principal water supply for the City of Brockton, whose water treatment plant is on Route 36 in Halifax. The inflow of the pond is Tubbs Meadow Brook, and the pond is the headwaters of the Jones River. Occasionally water is diverted into Silver Lake from Monponsett Pond in Halifax and Furnace Pond in Pembroke (through Tubbs Meadow Brook) whenever there is a water shortage. Although the lake is a reservoir, which prevents recreational activities to keep the drinking water clean, the water from the diversions are not and can pump in contaminated water. Monponsett Pond in particular has reoccurring toxic algae growths which get transferred into the lake. It is supposed to be the main source of the Jones River by contributing about twenty percent of the river's flow, but the Forge Pond Dam near its base lets out minimal, some years no, water to the river. This also prevents migratory aquatic animals from reaching the lake. Brockton prefers to keep the dam to have more accessible water. Access to the pond is through Silver Lake Sanctuary, a  property where one can walk, hike and fish, which is located at the end of Barses Lane, off Route 27 in Kingston.

Silver Lake village

Silver Lake is also the name of a village southeast of the lake in Kingston at the intersection of Grove Street and Lake Street, near the Kingston/Plympton town line . Silver Lake Regional High School is located north of the village on Route 27.

The name has also been incorporated into numerous businesses and organizations in the area.

External links
Environment Protection Agency
South Shore Coastal Watersheds - Lake Assessments

Reservoirs in Massachusetts
Lakes of Plymouth County, Massachusetts
Pembroke, Massachusetts
Kingston, Massachusetts
Plympton, Massachusetts
Buildings and structures in Plymouth County, Massachusetts
Protected areas of Plymouth County, Massachusetts